Liya Asylbekovna Nurkina (born September 28, 1984 in Guryev) is a Kazakhstani taekwondo practitioner. She won two bronze medals for the welterweight division at the 2003 World Taekwondo Championships in Garmisch-Partenkirchen, Germany, and at the 2007 Summer Universiade in Bangkok, Thailand.

Nurkina qualified for the women's 67 kg class at the 2008 Summer Olympics in Beijing, after defeating Filipino taekwondo jin Mary Antoinette Rivero in the final match of the Asian Qualification Tournament in Ho Chi Minh City, Vietnam. She lost the preliminary round of sixteen match to France's Gwladys Épangue, who was able to score three points at the end of the game.

References

External links

NBC 2008 Olympics profile

Kazakhstani female taekwondo practitioners
1984 births
Living people
Olympic taekwondo practitioners of Kazakhstan
Taekwondo practitioners at the 2008 Summer Olympics
People from Atyrau
Taekwondo practitioners at the 2006 Asian Games
Universiade medalists in taekwondo
Universiade bronze medalists for Kazakhstan
Asian Games competitors for Kazakhstan
World Taekwondo Championships medalists
Medalists at the 2007 Summer Universiade
21st-century Kazakhstani women